The  is a museum located in Shiraoi, Hokkaidō, Japan. The museum's mission is "to promote a proper understanding and awareness of Ainu history and culture in Japan and elsewhere out of respect for the dignity of the indigenous Ainu people, while contributing to the creation and development of new aspects of Ainu culture".

History 
It was originally scheduled to open on April 24th, 2020. However, due to the Covid-19 pandemic, the opening was rescheduled several times. It officially opened on July 12, 2020. It will serve as one of the three main facilities of Upopoy (meaning "singing in a large group"), alongside the National Ainu Park, and a memorial site on high ground on the east side of  where Ainu services are held.

The new National Museum supersedes and replaces the former Ainu Museum, which closed on the 31st of March, 2018 to make way for the new museum. The former museum was nestled beside a traditional Ainu village, a kotan. This traditional village remains in place on the west side of the grounds for visitors to experience a taste of traditional Ainu life.

Timeline 
 2007: The United Nations General Assembly adopted the "Declaration on the Rights of Indigenous Peoples".
 2008: The House of Representatives and the House of Councilors unanimously adopted a "resolution calling for the Ainu people to be indigenous peoples".
 2009: Proposed the development of a "space that symbolizes symbiosis with the people" in the report of the "Advisory Panel on Ainu Policy".
 2014: Cabinet decision on "Basic policy on the development and management of" a space that symbolizes symbiosis with the people "". It was decided to develop a symbolic space for ethnic symbiosis in Shiraoi.
 2015: The Agency for Cultural Affairs formulates the National Ainu Cultural Museum (tentative name) basic plan.
 2016: Established a public-private support network to promote space exchanges that symbolize ethnic symbiosis.
 2017: Published the outline of the basic design of the National Ainu Museum. Designated as the operating entity of the Ainu Culture Promotion and Research Promotion Organization.
 2018: Ainu Museum (Porotokotan) closed. The Ainu Culture Promotion and Research Promotion Organization merged with the Ainu Museum, and the name was changed to the Ainu Culture Foundation. The nickname for the symbolic space for ethnic symbiosis is decided to be "Upopoi".
 2019 (first year of Reiwa): Enforcement of the "Act on Promotion of Measures to Realize a Society in which the Pride of the Ainu People is Respected". Completion of memorial facility.
 2020: Due to the spread of the 2019 new coronavirus infection in Japan, the commemorative ceremony was held on July 11 after two postponements, and in July. Opened on the 12th. A TV commercial sung by KOM_I of Wednesday Campanella was aired.
 About 10,000 torchbearers were selected by open recruitment as the venue for the celebration at the 2020 Summer Olympics torch relay in Tokyo. Regarding the torch relay, the organizing committee was held by four sponsor companies and each prefectural executive committee. It was announced that there were a total of 535,717 applications for the runners' open call for participants.

Exhibits 
Exhibits are displayed according to six principal themes: the Ainu language, Ainu history, Ainu views of the world, Ainu livelihoods (hunting, gathering, fishing, farming), Ainu lifestyles (food, clothing, shelters, music, dance), and Ainu trade and exchange with surrounding peoples, including projected "multicultural coexistence" in the Japan of the future.

Access and parking
It is located about 1 hour by car from Sapporo and about 40 minutes by car from New Chitose Airport.

 Get off at the Donan Bus "Upopoy Mae" bus stop
 About 10 minutes on foot from the north exit of Shiraoi Station.
 Parking Lot
 Ordinary car 1st parking lot: 246 cars
 Ordinary car second parking lot: 311 cars
 Temporary parking lot for ordinary cars
 Large bus 1st parking lot: 50 cars
 Large bus second parking lot: 38 cars
 Bicycle parking lot
 Memorial facility Ordinary car parking lot: 66 cars

Gallery

See also
 Nibutani Ainu Culture Museum
 Historical Museum of the Saru River
 Hakodate City Museum of Northern Peoples

References

External links
  Upopoy National Ainu Museum and Park // 民族共生象徴空間
 The Foundation for Ainu Culture // 公益財団法人 アイヌ民族文化財団

Museums in Hokkaido
Shiraoi, Hokkaido
Museums established in 2020
2020 establishments in Japan
National museums of Japan
Ainu
Ethnic museums